Maevatanana may refer to municipalities in Madagascar:

 Maevatanana, a city in Betsiboka
 Maevatanana, Diana, a rural municipality in Diana Region